B62 may refer to :
 Sicilian, Richter-Rauzer, Encyclopaedia of Chess Openings code
 HLA-B62, an HLA-B serotype
 Bundesstraße 62, a German road
 B62 (New York City bus) in Brooklyn